TimeCamp is a web-based application launched in 2009 by Kamil Rudnicki, a programmer and founder of Time Solutions, to track the activity of computer users. The application is dedicated either to freelancers or teams. The tool is a time tracking software to invoice the employees' work based on an hourly rate, measuring the work effectiveness and project management.

TimeCamp, Inc. (formerly Time Solutions LLC) ─ a system manufacturer of TimeCamp ─ is an IT company based in Wrocław, founded in 2009 by Kamil Rudnicki, a 21-year-old student back then. The main investors of Time Solutions are Asseco Poland and Venture Incubator, which financed Time Solutions in 2011.

Features 
One of the characteristics of TimeCamp is automation of the processes connected to project and task management by the use of automatic time tracking. TimeCamp tracks billable and non-billable project hours, enabling its users to generate invoices automatically and use timesheets. The tool can be integrated with many project management platforms such as − Asana and Basecamp, as well as tools used for marketing automation, such as Zapier, Freshbooks and Slack.

Reception 
In 2009, TimeCamp was mentioned in The Wall Street Journal's article ''Tools to Manage Online Time Wisely''. Then, in 2014, The American Genius devoted the whole its article to the tool. In  2015, Minda Zetlin wrote about TC in INC,  while in 2016 Forbes included it in the list of the best time tracking software.  In 2017, GetApp reviewed TimeCamp and put it among ''Billing & Invoicing Category Leaders''.
 Kevin Getch described TimeCamp as “easily input time on tasks that have been assigned (...) also provides great reporting and allows you to assign users with different roles.”

See also 
 Comparison of time-tracking software
 Computer and network surveillance

References 

Task management software
Web applications